Donald G. Tennant (November 23, 1922 – December 8, 2001) was an American advertising agency executive.

He worked at the Leo Burnett agency in Chicago, Illinois. The agency placed anthropomorphic faces of 'critters' on packaged goods.Tennant was in charge of the Marlboro account and invented the Marlboro Man.

References

1922 births
2001 deaths
American marketing people
20th-century American businesspeople